The 1984 NCAA Division II football season, part of college football in the United States organized by the National Collegiate Athletic Association at the Division II level, began in August 1984, and concluded with the NCAA Division II Football Championship on December 8, 1984, at McAllen Veterans Memorial Stadium in McAllen, Texas. During the game's five-year stretch in McAllen, the "City of Palms", it was referred to as the Palm Bowl.

Troy State defeated North Dakota State in the championship game, 18–17, to win their first Division II national title.

Conference changes and new programs
Four programs departed Division II for Division I-AA prior to the season. Three were members of the Lone Star Conference, invited to join the newly formed, Division I-AA Gulf Star Conference.

Conference standings

Conference summaries

Postseason

The 1984 NCAA Division II Football Championship playoffs were the 12th single-elimination tournament to determine the national champion of men's NCAA Division II college football. The championship game was held at McAllen Veterans Memorial Stadium in McAllen, Texas, for the fourth consecutive time.

Playoff bracket

See also
1984 NCAA Division I-A football season
1984 NCAA Division I-AA football season
1984 NCAA Division III football season
1984 NAIA Division I football season
1984 NAIA Division II football season

References